Abies religiosa, the oyamel fir or sacred fir, (known as  in Spanish) is a fir native to the mountains of central and southern Mexico (Trans-Mexican Volcanic Belt, Sierra Madre del Sur) and western Guatemala. In the state of Veracruz, it grows with precipitation all year long. The tree is resistant to regular winter snowfalls.

Names 

The Spanish name  comes from the Nahuatl word oyametl (oya, "to thresh"; metl, "agave"; literally "threshing agave"). It is also called  (Christmas tree) in Mexico.  The English name derives from the binomial Abies religiosa, literally "religious fir". This comes from the use of its cut foliage in religious festivals (notably at Christmas) and in churches in Mexico.

Description

The leaf arrangement is spiral on the shoot, but with each leaf variably twisted at the base so they lie flat to either side of and above the shoot, with none below the shoot. The shoots are reddish-brown, hairless or with scattered pubescence.

The winged seeds are released when the cones disintegrate at maturity about 7–9 months after pollination. Trees from the western end of the range on Nevado de Colima, Jalisco have cones with larger, reflexed bract scales (similar to noble fir cones); these are sometimes treated as a separate species, Abies colimensis.

Significance
The sacred fir is the preferred tree for the monarch butterfly (Danaus plexippus) to reside in colonies during its hibernation in the forests of the Trans-Mexican Volcanic Belt. Although monarch butterflies are known in other parts of the southern Mexican highlands as some specimens do not migrate, the bulk of them gather in a few protected fir forests in the Monarch Butterfly Biosphere Reserve near the towns of Angangueo (Michoacán) and Avándaro (State of Mexico), from December to March.

The wood of the sacred fir is rather soft and thus not very suited for woodworking. Nonetheless, its distribution is decreasing because of logging for fuel and other human-related disturbances.

A 2012 paper by Cuauhtemoc Saenz-Romero among others, published in Forest Ecology and Management found that "the area suitable for the oyamel is likely to diminish by 96 percent by 2090, and disappear completely within the [Monarch Butterfly Biosphere] reserve."

Gallery

References

Liu, T. S. (11 November 1971). A Monograph of the genus Abies. National Taiwan University.

religiosa
Plants described in 1830
Trees of Durango
Trees of Guerrero
Trees of Hidalgo (state)
Trees of Jalisco
Trees of the State of Mexico
Trees of Michoacán
Trees of Morelos
Trees of Puebla
Trees of Veracruz
Flora of the Trans-Mexican Volcanic Belt
Trees of temperate climates
Least concern plants
Trees of Guatemala
Flora of the Sierra Madre del Sur